Kamila Gasiuk-Pihowicz (born 8 May 1983 in Warsaw) is a Polish lawyer and politician, former spokesperson for the political party Modern.

Career
In August 2014, Gasiuk-Pihowicz became the spokesperson for the political party Modern.
In October 2015, she was elected to the Sejm, running from the first position on the party's election list in the Warsaw II district, receiving 19,041 votes. 
On 9 January 2018, she replaced Katarzyna Lubnauer as chairperson of the Modern party's parliamentary group. 
In December 2018, she left the Modern party and joined Civic Platform.

Personal life
Her husband is Michał Pihowicz, a former treasurer of the Modern party. They have two children.

References

1983 births
Living people
Members of the Polish Sejm 2015–2019
Members of the Polish Sejm 2019–2023
Women members of the Sejm of the Republic of Poland
Modern (political party) politicians
Politicians from Warsaw
Political spokespersons
21st-century Polish women politicians